The city of Irkutsk is the administrative center of Irkutsk Oblast, both of which produced several famous popular musicians and have a number of styles of folk music.  Musicians from Irkutsk include the rock bands Bely Ostrog (a.k.a. Two Siberians (White Fort)), Printsip Neopredelyonnosti, and Chyorno-Belye Snimki.  The city of Irkutsk has long been a center for musical development in Siberia.

Music institutions
The Irkutsk Philharmonic Orchestra was founded in the 1850s.  The first major school of musical education was founded in 1899, followed a few years later by the opening of the Irkutsk branch of the Imperial Russian Musical Society.  Other music institutions include the Irkutsk Chamber Orchestra.

Musicians 
The bass singer Leonid Kharitonov was born in the village of Golumet in the Irkutsk Oblast in 1933.

Russian singer-songwriter Oleg Medvedev lives and works in Irkutsk.

References

Culture of Irkutsk Oblast
Irkutsk
Indigenous music